Abbadia Cerreto is a comune (municipality) located  southeast of Milan and  southeast of Lodi in the Province of Lodi, Lombardy, Italy.

Abbadia Cerreto borders the following municipalities: Bagnolo Cremasco, Crespiatica, Chieve, Corte Palasio, Casaletto Ceredano, Cavenago d'Adda. Its name comes from the local  Benedictine abbey, founded in 1084 by Alberic of Monte Cassino.

References

Articles which contain graphical timelines